The Oklahoma Secretary of Energy is a member of the Oklahoma Governor's Cabinet. The Secretary is appointed by the Governor, with the consent of the Oklahoma Senate, to serve at the pleasure of the Governor. The Secretary serves as the chief advisor to the Governor on energy policy development and implementation.

The last Secretary was Mike Ming, who was appointed by Governor Mary Fallin on January 10, 2011.

Recent Secretaries of the successor office, the Office of the Secretary of Energy and Environment have included Michael Teague and Kenneth Wagner.

History
The Office of the Secretary of the Environment was established in 1986 to provide greater oversight and coordination to the energy activities of the State government. The Office was established, along with the Oklahoma State Cabinet, by the Executive Branch Reform Act of 1986. The Act directed the Secretary of Energy to advise the Governor on energy policy and advise the state energy agencies on new policy as directed by the Governor.

Oklahoma state law allows for Cabinet Secretaries to serve concurrently as the head of a State agency in addition to their duties as a Cabinet Secretary. Historically, the Secretary of Energy has not served in any such dual position.

The offices of the Office of the Secretary of Energy and the Office of the Secretary of the Environment were merged in 2013, creating the Office of the Secretary of Energy and Environment.

www.ee.ok.gov

Responsibilities
The Secretary of Energy serves as the principal state government entity that is responsible for regulating and promoting the existing energy industry in the State. The Secretary is responsible for overseeing energy conservation, energy-related research, energy production, and alternative and renewable energy development. The Energy Secretary is also one of three Cabinet Secretaries that serves on the Executive Environmental Committee of the Governor's Cabinet, along with the Oklahoma Secretary of Agriculture and the Oklahoma Secretary of the Environment.

The Secretary serves ex officio as the Governor's representative of the Interstate Oil and Gas Compact Commission. As the Governor's official representative, the Secretary represents the State on the Commission and advocates for the conservation of oil and gas resources.

As of fiscal year 2011, the Secretary of Energy oversees 969 full-time employees and is responsible for annual budget of over $641 million.

Office of the Secretary
The Secretary heads the Office of the Secretary of Energy, which is a state agency.

Mission and goals
The mission statement of the office is:
The goals of the Oklahoma Secretary of Energy are to support current energy industries, facilitate the development of alternative and renewable energies, and to foster the growth and economic development of the state through strategic diversity.

The stated goals of the office are:
Prioritize the use of Oklahoma Resources when developing plans to meet the State's energy needs for transportation fuels and power generation
Support Oklahoma's existing oil and natural gas industry
Ensure stability and supply of electricity at a reasonable cost to Oklahoma homes and businesses through ample electricity generation and a robust transmission grid
Increase research, development and demonstration projects for biofuels to complement petroleum for transportation fuels and for alternative energy including wind, hydro and solar to generate electricity
Help Oklahomans understand the need for conservation and help reduce consumption and manage demand

Staff
The staff of the Office serves as the immediate staff to the Secretary. The Office has a very limited staff: three full-time employees including the Secretary. As of 2010, the following are the authorized positions within the Office:
Secretary of Energy
Deputy Secretary of Energy
Special Assistant and Legislative Liaison

Budget
For fiscal year 2011, with three employees, the office has an annual budget of just under $1 million. All of that budget is dedicated to employee compensation and operating expenses.

Salary
The annual salary of the Secretary of Energy is set by law at $70,000. Despite this law, if the Secretary serves as the head of a state agency, the Secretary receives the higher of the two salaries. Since incumbent Secretary Bobby Wegener also serves as the governor's representative to the Interstate Oil and Gas Compact Commission, he receives the salary allowed for that position. As of 2010, the annual salary of that position is set at $90,000.

Agencies Overseen
The Secretary of Energy oversees the following State entities:
Oklahoma Corporation Commission
Oklahoma Department of Mines
Oklahoma Energy Resources Board 
Oklahoma Marginal Wells Commission
Oklahoma Bioenergy Center
Clean Energy Independence Commission

The Secretary is also responsible for representing the Governor before the following entities:
Southwest Power Pool
Interstate Oil and Gas Compact Commission
Western Governors' Association
Grand River Dam Authority

List of Secretaries

See also
United States Department of Energy

References

External links
Office of the Secretary of Energy website

Energy, Office of the Secretary of
Energy
Energy